Michael David Elkins (born July 20, 1966) is a former American football quarterback in the National Football League (NFL) and the World League of American Football (WLAF). In the NFL, Elkins played for the Kansas City Chiefs, the Cleveland Browns and the Houston Oilers. In the WLAF, he played for the  Sacramento Surge. Elkins attended Wake Forest.

Professional career
Elkins was selected in the second round (32nd overall) of the 1989 NFL Draft by the Kansas City Chiefs. The four months that he experienced from Senior Bowl week until he was picked by the Chiefs were chronicled in "Maximum Exposure," an article in the May 1, 1989 issue of Sports Illustrated.

References

External links
 NFL & WLAF stats

1966 births
Living people
Players of American football from Greensboro, North Carolina
American football quarterbacks
Wake Forest Demon Deacons football players
Kansas City Chiefs players
Sacramento Surge players
Cleveland Browns players
Houston Oilers players
Grimsley High School alumni